Apache Heron is a distributed stream processing engine developed at Twitter. According to the creators at Twitter, the scale and diversity of Twitter data has increased, and Heron is a real-time analytics platform to process streaming. It was introduced at the SIGMOD 2015. Heron is API compatible with Apache Storm.

See also
 List of Apache Software Foundation projects

References

External links
 Official Apache Heron page

Distributed stream processing